A Scot is a member of an ethnic group indigenous to Scotland, derived from the Latin name of Gaelic raiders, the Scoti.

Scot may also refer to:

 , a Norwegian coaster
 Scot and lot, phrase common in the records of English medieval boroughs, applied to householders who were assessed for a borough tax
 Social construction of technology (SCOT), theory within the field of Science and Technology Studies
 SCOT, an enzyme encoded by the OXCT1 gene
 S.C.O.T., a rap album

People
 Scot (given name)
 Scot (surname)

See also

 Scotus (disambiguation)
 Scott (disambiguation)
 Scotch (disambiguation)
 Scut (disambiguation)